Split Personality is the sixth studio album by All-4-One. It was exclusively released in Japan on May 31, 2004 and features the single "Someone Who Lives In Your Heart."

Track listing
 "Someone Who Lives In Your Heart"
 "I Just Wanna Be Your Everything"
 "I Prayed 4 U"
 "Like That"
 "Men Are Not Supposed To Cry"
 "Here Is My Heart"
 "Get It Right"
 "Why"
 "One More Day"
 "Workin' On Me"
 "Movin' On"
 "Bridge Over Troubled Waters"
 "2 Sides 2 Every Story"
 "Quedetha"

References

2004 albums
Universal Records albums
All-4-One albums